Harriet Cordner (born 22 July 1992) is an Australian rules footballer with the Carlton Football Club in the AFL Women's competition. She previously played four seasons with  after being recruited to the club as a category B rookie in October 2016. She played every match in her debut season to finish with seven games. She was delisted in May 2017 but was quickly re-signed by Melbourne as a free agent.

She is the granddaughter of the former  player, Brownlow Medallist, and two time VFL premiership player Don Cordner.

At the conclusion of the 2020 season, she was traded to Richmond in exchange for an early second round pick in the 2020 draft. Cordner achieved selection in Champion Data's 2021 AFLW All-Star stats team, after leading the league for average intercept marks in the 2021 AFL Women's season, totalling 2.6 a game.

In March 2023, Cordner was traded to Carlton.

Statistics
Statistics are correct to the end of the 2020 season.

|- style="background:#EAEAEA"
| scope="row" text-align:center | 2017
| 
| 21 || 7 || 1 || 1 || 18 || 11 || 29 || 4 || 23 || 0.1 || 0.1 || 2.6 || 1.6 || 4.1 || 0.6 || 3.3
|-
| scope="row" text-align:center | 2018
| 
| 21 || 4 || 0 || 0 || 21 || 12 || 33 || 7 || 13 || 0.0 || 0.0 || 5.3 || 3.0 || 8.3 || 1.8 || 3.3
|- style="background:#EAEAEA"
| scope="row" text-align:center | 2019
| 
| 21 || 7 || 0 || 0 || 45 || 28 || 73 || 16 || 10 || 0.0 || 0.0 || 6.4 || 4.0 || 10.4 || 2.3 || 1.4
|-
| scope="row" text-align:center | 2020
| 
| 21 || 7 || 0 || 1 || 32 || 27 || 59 || 8 || 20 || 0.0 || 0.1 || 4.6 || 3.9 || 8.4 || 1.1 || 2.9
|- class="sortbottom"
! colspan=3 | Career
! 25
! 1
! 2
! 116
! 78
! 194
! 35
! 66
! 0.0
! 0.1
! 4.6
! 3.1
! 7.8
! 1.4
! 2.6
|}

References

External links 

1992 births
Living people
Melbourne Football Club (AFLW) players
Australian rules footballers from Victoria (Australia)
Richmond Football Club (AFLW) players